In mathematics, the (exponential) shift theorem is a theorem about polynomial differential operators (D-operators) and exponential functions. It permits one to eliminate, in certain cases, the exponential from under the D-operators.

Statement 
The theorem states that, if P(D) is a polynomial D-operator, then, for any sufficiently differentiable function y,

To prove the result, proceed by induction. Note that only the special case
 

needs to be proved, since the general result then follows by linearity of D-operators.

The result is clearly true for n = 1 since

Now suppose the result true for n = k, that is,

Then,

This completes the proof.

The shift theorem can be applied equally well to inverse operators:

Related 

There is a similar version of the shift theorem for Laplace transforms:

Examples 
The exponential shift theorem can be used to speed the calculation of higher derivatives of functions that is given by the product of an exponential and another function. For instance, if , one has that

Another application of the exponential shift theorem is to solve linear differential equations whose characteristic polynomial has repeated roots.

Notes

References 
 

Multivariable calculus
Shift theorem
Theorems in analysis